Big Belly Burger is a fictional fast food restaurant chain in the DC Comics universe. It has appeared in a number of comic book titles and stories, alongside multiple appearances in other media, most notably including various television series set in the Arrowverse.

Fictional history

Big Belly Burger was created by writer John Byrne in the comic book Adventures of Superman in June 1988. The fast food chain was given its initial visual appearance by penciller Jerry Ordway. The restaurant was inspired by Bob's Big Boy, a real-world chain of restaurants.

In DC Comics publications, Big Belly Burger is said to be one of the largest fast-food chains in the United States. Founded in Coast City in the 1950s, the chain opened restaurants across the world following its purchase by LexCorp. Big Belly Burger is well-known in the DC Comics universe for its French fries, milkshakes, and large hamburgers. Its signature menu items include three burgers: the Belly Buster, the Belly Bloater, the Belly Flop, and the Cheesemeister Deluxe. Its signature milkshake is the "Chocorrific", although it also sells a strawberry-banana shake. Desserts sold include apple pie and a "Drizzle Doodle" (whose exact composition is not defined). The restaurant is depicted as also selling a hot dogs egg salad sandwiches, chicken sliders, fish sandwiches, and breakfast items. The chain's products include "value" combination meals (main item, side, and drink) and "Jolly Meals", a child's meal that comes in a box with an action figure. The "Smiley Meal" is a similar boxed meal including a burger, fries, and cookie.

The Big Belly Burger mascot is a smiling, bearded, red-haired man with glasses (modeled on comic book writer and editor Andy Helfer). The mascot is often depicted holding aloft a plate on which a large hamburger rests. Variations of the mascot also appear, such as a mascot with an upraised arm and no plate. Beginning around 2008, a Big Belly Burger logo began to be depicted in DC Comics. This logo consists of a large red circle with a heavy black border, a smaller white smiley off-center at the top of the red circle, and two three-fingered cartoonish hands (one in the red circle, one opposite the smiley at the top of the red circle). The image looks like a rotund, smiling person patting a fat stomach and giving a thumb's up. Big Belly Burger also has a catchphrase, "It's Belly Belly good" (a play on the words "very very good"). The slogan "Big Choices, Big Value, Big Belly!" has also been used.

All Big Belly Burgers have a drive-through. Some Big Belly Burger locations are depicted in the comics as having a "Playplace", an area where small children can play on jungle gym equipment and slides. At least one has a jukebox.

Various stories also establish that Big Belly Burger enjoys widespread brand awareness, and only O'Shaughnessy's (a fictional fast food chain with an Irish theme which also appears in DC Comics) may have more locations and be better known by the public.

Notable appearances

Superman
Big Belly Burger has appeared more often in Superman comics than in any other DC Comics publication. One notable appearance was in a 1990 story in which the villainous magical imp Mr. Mxyzptlk animated a Big Belly Burger mascot statue and used it to fight Superman. In 1999, Superman characters Jimmy Olsen and Perry White were depicted in an advertisement for the fast food chain:

In January 2016, Jimmy Olsen mentions that the first time he and Clark Kent spent time together was at a Big Belly Burger, and that he had his first interview with Superman at the same restaurant after the meal. A background image in the same issue of Superman shows a Big Belly Burger "Employee of the Month" named Stan, who bears a strong resemblance to legendary comic book writer, editor, and publisher Stan Lee.

Booster Gold
The superhero Booster Gold was once depicted as working (for a brief time) at a Big Belly Burger. He also is depicted appearing in Big Belly Burger television advertisements, and a Big Belly Burger sticker appeared on Booster Gold's coffin along with other corporate sponsors (including Soder Cola, Cap's Hobby Shoppe, EZ Caskets, Guardian Cigarettes, Lit Beer, Pep Cereals, and Vertigo Comics).

Son of Vulcan
Big Belly Burger made two appearances in the Son of Vulcan limited series comic book. The first issue of the publication depicted Big Belly Burger as the location where 14-year-old orphan Miguel "Mikey" Devante worked when he met the superhero Vulcan and received his powers from him. The fictional restaurant appeared again in the limited series' final issue, after Devante defeated a group of supervillains.

Other heroes
Will Payton, the teenage version of the superhero Starman, is depicted as a Big Belly Burger employee in a 1989 story, and the DC Comics alien Nix Uotan is depicted working at Big Belly Burger during his exile on Earth in a 2008 story. The superheroine Skyrocket of the superhero group Power Company also was depicted working at a Big Belly Burger in order to earn money prior to becoming a hero-for-hire in a 2002 tale. Captain Marvel ate a Big Belly Burger at almost every meal during his time with the Justice League.

Other versions

Injustice: Gods Among Us
In the ninth issue of Injustice: Gods Among Us - Year Five, Bizarro and the Trickster eat at a Negev-based Big Belly Burger location. After Bizarro accidentally starts a fight, he misinterprets a statement from the Trickster and massacres the witnesses at the restaurant with his heat-vision.<ref>Injustice: Gods Among Us - Year Five #9 (May 2016).</ref>

In other media
Film
 A Portland-based Big Belly Burger location appears in Justice League vs. the Fatal Five, where various members of the Justice League, Jessica Cruz and Star Boy eat dinner there following their first battle with the Fatal Five.
Television
 The fictional chain appears a number of times in the TV shows set in the Arrowverse:
 Big Belly Burger is regularly featured in first and second seasons of the television series Arrow, and occasionally thereafter. Big Belly Burger made its first appearance in the third episode of the first season, where John Diggle brings Oliver Queen and Tommy Merlyn to the restaurant after they are beaten by Max Fuller's henchmen. Diggle's sister in law, Carly, is a waitress there. It makes another major appearance when Oliver Queen, John Diggle, and Felicity Smoke meet at the Big Belly Burger where Carly works as they plot to capture a jewel thief known as The Dodger. A Big Belly Burger is where The Canary first appeared in the second season premiere episode. Felicity Smoak announced toward the end of the second season that she's no longer patronizing the restaurant: "No Big Belly Burger, though; it's giving me a big belly."
 Big Belly Burger is also regularly featured in the television series The Flash. The restaurant makes its first appearance in the show's premiere episode, and in another episode The Flash locates a villain after being told the attack is occurring near a Big Belly Burger. The series depicts the Flash as needing to eat a large amount of food to replenish the energy expended by running. In the episode "Revenge of the Rogues", the hero is shown having eaten several hundred Big Belly Burger hamburgers (whose wrappings lie in a pile next to him). Eobard Thawne mentions that he's a fan of Big Belly Burger in the season one finale "Fast Enough". He's seen later in the same episode eating a Big Belly Burger hamburger, drink, and fries. Hunter Zolomon of Earth-Two (posing as Jay Garrick) remarks that every Earth in the Multiverse has a Big Belly Burger. A Big Belly Burger meal is one of the first things the Harrison Wells of Earth-2 asks for when he meets the Flash in the episode "The Darkness and the Light".
 In the Supergirl episode "Fallout", Kara Danvers brings a serving of Big Belly Burger food to Lena Luthor.
 In the Legends of Tomorrow episode "Meat: The Legends", it is revealed that Big Belly Burger originally began as a diner named Big Bang Burger located in San Bernardino in 1955 where it is run by Bert Beeman. His wife Rhonda found a liquid from a cocoon that was located in a displaced alien pod she found and used it for the secret sauce so that they can have Big Bang Burger outdo the restaurant opened by "those two brothers". The Legends stumbled upon Rhonda's plot and she is killed when a moth-like Giant Air Feeder emerges from its cocoon and eats her. After Bert is eaten by the Giant Air Feeder which is later slain by Esperanza "Spooner" Cruz, waitress Sandy Sledge becomes the new owner of the restaurant and renames it Big Belly Burger.

 In Powerless, an advertisement for Big Belly Burger can briefly be seen in the pilot episode "Wayne or Lose".

 A Big Belly Burger location appears in the Justice League Action episode "Best Day Ever", where it is visited by the Joker and Lex Luthor. This version of the restaurant serves more than burgers, with their food items including Belly Tacos and Double Belly Cheese Fries.

 A Los Angeles-based Big Belly Burger location can be seen in the background of the Young Justice: Outsiders episode "Influence".

 A Central City-based Big Belly Burger location appears in the Scooby-Doo and Guess Who? episode "One Minute Mysteries!", where it is visited by Barry Allen, Shaggy Rogers and Scooby-Doo.

Video games
 Big Belly Burger is referenced in the DC Universe Online. It is a four-part "Franchise Briefing" (e.g., information about a business appearing in the DC Universe Online) that can be found in the Little Bohemia and Chinatown districts of Metropolis and in the Burnley and Diamond Districts of Gotham. Players may also collect five types of cookies (such as the Big Belly Dinner Mint Cookie, the Big Belly HappyTime Meal Cookie, or the Choco-brand Big Belly Cookie Bits), and receive a secret message as well as a piece of alien technology.

 Big Belly Burger referenced in the Batman: Arkham Origins. There are billboards throughout the city advertising the restaurant. Discarded burger wrappers and drinks appear in the game in the Gotham City Police Department.

 In Lego Dimensions, Green Arrow attempts to persuade Homer Simpson to help him track down Hank Scorpio by promising to take him to Big Belly Burger afterwards. Despite this promise, Homer ignores him due to his stupidity.

Six Flags Parks 
 In all seven versions of Justice League: Battle for Metropolis, signs advertising Big Belly Burger can be seen in the final subway chase scene.

 Real-life Big Belly Burger stands operate at Six Flags Discovery Kingdom and Six Flags Magic Mountain.

Miscellaneous
Although it does not appear in the actual film, Big Belly Burger is referenced in tie-in materials to the film Batman v Superman: Dawn of Justice. This version of the restaurant chain solely operates along the East Coast of the United States and has locations in Coast City, Gotham City and Metropolis. This version also has burgers named after real people in the DC universe, such as the Wayne Steakburger for Bruce Wayne and the Dent Double for Harvey Dent.

In promotion for the release of Zack Snyder's Justice League'', Warner Bros. Consumer Products partnered with Wonderland Restaurants to release a real-life Big Belly hamburger as part of its "Mother Box" take-home dining experience. This version of the burger was topped with lettuce, tomatoes, onions, an eight ounce beef patty, and potato and onion rösti on a pretzel bun. It was sold from April to May 2021.

References
Notes

Citations

Fictional restaurants
Green Arrow
Flash (comics)
Superman
Arrowverse
Supergirl (TV series)